Kim Jun-hong (born 28 October 1990) is a South Korean shooter. He represented his country at the 2016 Summer Olympics.

References

External links

1990 births
Living people
South Korean male sport shooters
Shooters at the 2016 Summer Olympics
Olympic shooters of South Korea
Asian Games medalists in shooting
Asian Games gold medalists for South Korea
Asian Games silver medalists for South Korea
Asian Games bronze medalists for South Korea
Shooters at the 2014 Asian Games
Shooters at the 2018 Asian Games
Medalists at the 2014 Asian Games
Medalists at the 2018 Asian Games
ISSF pistol shooters
20th-century South Korean people
21st-century South Korean people